There are a number of football clubs based in Potsdam, the capital of Brandenburg in Germany, but the most successful team is the women's football club 1. FFC Turbine Potsdam.

The following teams are ranked according to the league they play in (updated for the 2012–13 season):

Bundesliga (I)
none

2. Bundesliga (II)
none

3. Liga (III)
 SV Babelsberg 03

Regionalliga Nord (IV)
none

NOFV-Oberliga Nord (V)
none

Brandenburg-Liga (VI)
 SV Babelsberg 03 II
 Werderaner FC Viktoria 1920

Brandenburger Landesliga (Nord) (VII)
 RSV Eintracht Teltow 1949

Brandenburger Landesliga (Süd) (VII)
 SG Michendorf

Brandenburger Landesklasse-Mitte (VIII)
 Fortuna Babelsberg
 FSV Babelsberg 74
 SV Babelsberg 03 III
 Potsdamer Kickers
 Teltower FV 1913

Kreisliga (Havelland-Mitte) (IX)
 Eintracht 90 Babelsberg
 Fortuna Babelsberg II
 SG Blau-Weiß Beelitz
 SG Bornim
 Caputher SV
 Potsdamer Kickers II
 SV Ruhlsdorf 1893
 SG Saarmund
 RSV Eintracht Teltow 1949 II
 Werderaner FC Viktoria 1920 II

1. Kreisklasse (Havelland-Mitte) (X)
 FSV Babelsberg 74 II
 SG Blau-Weiß Beelitz II
 SG Bornim II
 Eintracht Glindow
 SG Grün-Weiß Golm
 SG Rot-Weiß Groß Glienicke
 FSV Groß Kreutz
 SG Michendorf II
 FV Turbine Potsdam 55
 SG Saarmund II
 ESV Lok Seddin

2. Kreisklasse (Havelland-Mitte) (XI)
 Caputher SV II
 SV 1948 Ferch
 Eintracht Glindow II
 SG Grün-Weiß Golm II
 Juventas Crew Alpha
 SG Michendorf III
 Eintracht Potsdam West
 ESV Lokomotiv Potsdam
 Potsdamer Kickers III
 UFK Potsdam
 Teltower FV 1913 II
 Werderaner FC Viktoria 1920 III

3. Kreisklasse Staffel A (Havelland-Mitte) (XII)
 FSV Groß Kreutz II
 SG Paaren

3. Kreisklasse Staffel B (Havelland-Mitte) (XII)
 Eintracht 90 Babelsberg II
 Fortuna Babelsberg III
 FSV Babelsberg 74 III
 Juventas Crew Alpha II
 Potsdamer FC 73
 Eintracht Potsdam West II
 ESV Lokomotiv Potsdam II
 FV Turbine Potsdam 55 II
 Potsdamer Sport-Union 04
 USV Potsdam
 SV 05 Rehbrücke
 SV Ruhlsdorf 1893 II
 SG Saarmund III
 SG Schenkenhorst
 FC Blau-Weiß Stücken
 RSV Eintracht Teltow 1949 III

References 
 www.fussball.de

Football
Potsdam
Foo